Clare Hall may refer to:

United Kingdom
Clare Hall, Cambridge, a constituent college of the University of Cambridge
Clare College, Cambridge, a constituent college of the University of Cambridge, originally called Clare Hall
Clare Hall Manor, a former health facility in Hertfordshire, England

Elsewhere
Clare Town Hall, a museum in Clare, New York, United States
Clare Hall, a city in Antigua and Barbuda
Clarehall Shopping Centre, in Coolock, Dublin, Ireland